Richard Tahuora Himona (7 September 1905 – 7 August 1984) was a New Zealand  farmer and community leader. Of Māori descent, he identified with the Ngati Kahungunu iwi. He was born in Te Ore Ore, Wairarapa, New Zealand on 7 September 1905.

References

1905 births
1984 deaths
New Zealand farmers
People from the Wairarapa
Ngāti Kahungunu people
New Zealand Māori farmers